Nikola Janović (born 22 March 1980, in Kotor) is a Montenegrin water polo player and the former Minister of Sports and Youth of Montenegro. He was one of the best water polo player in the world. He was a captain of the Montenegro men's national water polo team and a World and European champion with SRJ, Serbia and Montenegro, and Montenegro (2001, 2005, 2008)  . He is a member of the Parliament of Montenegro. 

Since summer 2011, Janović has been playing for VK Jug from Dubrovnik. He is the elder brother of Mlađan Janović.

In 2012, he was part of the Montenegrin water polo team that once again reached the semi finals of the Olympic men's water polo competition.

Career
Janović played for VK Primorac (1994–1998), VK Crvena Zvezda (1998–2000), VK Bečej (2000–2001), VK Primorac (2001–2004), PVK Jadran (2004–2006), CN Posillipo (2006–2009), PVK Jadran (2009–2011) and VK Jug (2011–2016).

Honours
VK Bečej

See also
 List of world champions in men's water polo
 List of World Aquatics Championships medalists in water polo

References

External links
 

1980 births
Living people
Montenegrin male water polo players
Olympic water polo players of Montenegro
Water polo players at the 2008 Summer Olympics
Water polo players at the 2012 Summer Olympics
World Aquatics Championships medalists in water polo
Government ministers of Montenegro